"Heart of the Matter" is the eleventh episode of the Once Upon a Time spin-off series Once Upon a Time in Wonderland. Written by Jenny Kao and Katie Wech and directed by David Boyd, it premiered on ABC in the United States on March 20, 2014.

In this episode, Anastasia's past involving Cora, the Queen of Hearts is revealed, including a secret of Will's while in present day Wonderland, Alice and Cyrus makes an unexpected trip to Storybrooke to procure an item of great importance as Jafar's plan to break the laws of magic inches closer.

Plot

Opening Sequence
Jafar's serpent staff is shown in the forest.

In the characters' past
Anastasia, the soon-to-be Red Queen of Wonderland is introduced to her servants Tweedledee and Tweedledum at the castle. During a conversation with them, the Queen of Hearts, Cora, who is shocked to have been invited to the Red King's wedding, pays them an unexpected visit to meet the new Queen. Cora offers to teach Anastasia magic to make life as a royal easier at the castle, but Anastasia declines the offer as the Red King frowns on the usage of magic which separates the royals and their servants. While not pleased with Anastasia's answer, Cora leaves her offer open. As the wedding day approaches, Will Scarlet secretly visits Anastasia, hoping that Anastasia is duping the King into marrying her just to steal his jewels. As Anastasia retaliates, Cora eavesdrops on their conversation and alerts the guards to the room, not before Will leaves. Cora pays Will a visit and listen to his concern regarding not being able to fully move on from Anastasia. Will asks Cora to remove his heart so that he can never feel any form of emotion. Upon doing so, Cora keeps his heart and later shows Anastasia that Will has decided to move on and no longer loves her. Cora then proceeds to teach a now-heartbroken Anastasia magic.

In Wonderland
Alice and Cyrus is alerted by Tweedledum to escape Wonderland under Anastasia's orders upon the Jabberwocky's freedom. However, as they wouldn't want to give up on Will, they head into the castle via a tunnel to save both Will and Anastasia. Meanwhile, Jafar, unable to change the laws of magic due to Will's genie bottle, uses the Jabberwocky on Anastasia to find out the problem. As the Jabberwocky uses her magic to creep into Anastasia's memories, she accidentally reads Alice's mind, who is in the dungeon with Cyrus. Knowing what was the problem, she escapes the dungeon with Cyrus and seeks the White Rabbit's help to locate Will's heart. Using the portal, they head to Storybrooke. Once retrieving Will's heart, the trio returns to Wonderland and is ambushed by Jafar who steals it, but before losing his staff to them. Alice and Cyrus realize that the staff is Cyrus' mother. Jafar returns Will's heart and in order to make sure the heart was functioning properly, he kills Anastasia in-front of Will, who is in a fit upon Anastasia's death.

In Storybrooke
Via the portal, Alice, Cyrus, and the White Rabbit arrives in the main street and heads to Will's home to find his heart. Once inside, they find a drawing of Anastasia and realize the heart is hidden in the wall behind the drawing. Using some darts, they uncover a box with Will's heart and returns to Wonderland.

Production
Jenny Kao & Katie Wech were the writers for the episode, while David Boyd was its director.

Reception

Ratings
The episode was watched by 3.51 million American viewers, and received an 18-49 rating/share of 0.8/3, roughly the same demo as the previous episode but up in the total viewers number. The show placed fifth in its timeslot and twelfth for the night.

Critical reception
Christine Orlando of TV Fanatic gave the episode a 4.5 out of 5, signaling positive reviews.

Ashley B. of Spoiler TV gave the episode a positive review. She said:

References

External links
 

2014 American television episodes
Once Upon a Time in Wonderland episodes